Galwey is a surname. Notable people with the surname include:

Mick Galwey (born 1966), Irish rugby union and Gaelic footballer
Galwey baronets